The 2018 Segunda División B play-offs (Playoffs de Ascenso or Promoción de Ascenso) are the final playoffs for promotion from 2017–18 Segunda División B to the 2018–19 Segunda División. The four first placed teams in each one of the four groups qualify for the promotion playoffs and the four last placed teams in Segunda División are relegated to Segunda División B. It also decides the teams which placed 16th to be relegated to the 2018–19 Tercera División.

Format
The four group winners have the opportunity to promote directly and become the overall Segunda División B champion. The four group winners will be drawn into a two-legged series where the two winners will be promoted to the Segunda División and will enter into the final for the Segunda División B champion. The two losing semifinalists will enter the playoff round for the last two promotion spots.

The four group runners-up will be drawn against one of the three fourth-placed teams outside their group while the four third-placed teams will be drawn against each other in a two-legged series. The six winners will advance with the two losing semifinalists to determine the four teams that will enter the last two-legged series for the last two promotion spots. In all the playoff series, the lower-ranked club will play at home first. Whenever there is a tie in position (e.g. like the group winners in the Semifinal Round and Final or the third-placed teams in the first round), a draw will determine the club to play at home first.

Controversies about eligibility of teams
Despite the ineligibility of Deportivo Fabril for promotion, due to the relegation of Deportivo La Coruña to Segunda División, the reserve team participated in the promotion playoffs. Fuenlabrada and Rápido de Bouzas demanded the Royal Spanish Football Federation to not allow the Galicians to play, by filing a lawsuit.

In another way, some rumours were published in the media about Racing Santander demanding the Federation not allow Sporting Gijón B to play, even though the reserve team of the rojiblancos could be promoted if the main side is promoted to La Liga. However, the Cantabrian club denied that information.

Group Winners promotion play-off

Qualified teams

Bracket

Matches

Semifinals

|}

First leg

Second leg

Final

|}

Non-champions promotion play-off

First round

Qualified teams

Matches

|}

First leg

Second leg

Second round

Qualified teams

Matches

|}

First leg

Second leg

Third round

Qualified teams

Matches

|}

First leg

Second leg

Relegation play-off

Qualified teams

Matches
The losers of this tournament will be relegated to the 2018–19 Tercera División.

|}

First leg

Second leg

References 

Segunda División B play-offs
2018 Spanish football leagues play-offs
2017–18 Segunda División B